Admiral Sir Michael Maynard Denny  (3 October 1896 – 7 April 1972) was a Royal Navy officer who went on to be Third Sea Lord.

Naval career
Educated at Queen Elizabeth's School, Wimborne Minster, the Royal Naval College, Osborne and the Royal Naval College, Dartmouth, Denny joined the Royal Navy in 1909. He served in World War I and, after the War, specialised in gunnery. In 1932 he joined the staff of the Commander-in-Chief, Mediterranean Fleet. He spent two years at sea as an executive officer before becoming assistant director of Naval Ordnance at the Admiralty in 1937. He was appointed deputy director of Naval Ordnance in 1938.

He served in World War II as Senior Naval Officer for the Åndalsnes landing and then as Chief Staff Officer for the Dunkirk evacuation in 1940. In 1942 he was given command of the cruiser HMS Kenya. He became Chief of Staff to the Commander-in-Chief, Home Fleet later that year. In 1943 he took command of the aircraft carrier  from which he conducted air strikes against Okinawa in Japan.

After the War he became Assistant Chief of Naval Personnel and Director of Personal Services and then, from 1947, Flag Officer (Destroyers) for the Mediterranean Fleet. In 1949 he became Third Sea Lord and Controller of the Navy and in 1954 he was made Commander-in-Chief, Home Fleet and Commander-in-Chief, Eastern Atlantic. He was appointed Chairman of the British Joint Services Mission to Washington, D.C. and UK Representative on the NATO Standing Group in 1956. He retired in 1959.

In retirement he became a Director of Cammell Laird.

Family
In 1923 he married Sara Annie Esme Welman.

References

|-

|-

1896 births
1972 deaths
Graduates of Britannia Royal Naval College
Royal Navy admirals
Knights Grand Cross of the Order of the Bath
Commanders of the Order of the British Empire
Companions of the Distinguished Service Order
Lords of the Admiralty
People educated at Queen Elizabeth's Grammar School, Wimborne Minster
People educated at the Royal Naval College, Osborne
British naval attachés
Military personnel from Gloucestershire
Royal Navy personnel of World War I
Royal Navy personnel of World War II